The Identity card of Kosovo is an ID card issued to the citizens of Kosovo for the purpose of establishing their identity, as well as serving as proof of residency, right to work and right to public benefits. A biometric ID card has been issued since 2013.

Design

International travel
An identity card of Kosovo can be used instead of a passport for travel to some countries neighbouring Kosovo:

See also
Kosovan passport

External links
Ministria e Punëve të Brendshme të Kosovës / Ministry of Internal Affairs of Kosovo
Procedure to obtain the Kosovo ID Card (alb)
PRADO - Kosovo ID card

Notes and references
Notes:

References:

Government of Kosovo
National identity cards by country